The Korea National Ice Hockey Championship is an annual ice hockey tournament played in South Korea. Any team from South Korea could participate, as long as it is a member of the Korea Ice Hockey Association. The inaugural edition was held in 1946.

Champions

1955 Jeon-hwui-mun team
1957 Korean Air Force
1958 Whimoon Club
1959 Whimoon Club and Kwangsung High School (co-champions)
1960 Whimoon Club
1961 Kyunggi Club and Kwangsung High School (co-champions)
1963 Jeon-gwang-seong team
1964 Yonsei University
1966 Kyung Hee University
1967 Kyung Hee University
1968 Yonsei University
1969 Korean Army team
1970 Kyung Hee University
1971 Korea University
1972 Korea University
1973 Korea University
1976 Kyung Hee University
1977 Kyung Hee University
1978 Kyung Hee University
1981 January Korea University
1981 December Yonsei University
1982 Korea University
1983 Korea University
1984 Korea University
1985 Korea University
1986 Yonsei University
1987 Hanyang University
1988 Yonsei University
1989 Yonsei University
1990 Yonsei University
1991 Hanyang University
1992 Yonsei University
1993 Yonsei University
1994 Seoktap
1995 Yonsei University
1996 Mando Winia
1997 Mando Winia
1998 Yonsei University
1999 Halla Winia
2000 Halla Winia
2001 Dongwon Dreams
2002 Dongwon Dreams
2003 Korea University
2004 Yonsei University
2005 Halla Winia
2006 Kangwon Land
2007 High1
2008 High1
2009 Anyang Halla
2010 Anyang Halla
2011 High1
2012 High1
2013 Daemyung Sangmu
2014 Anyang Halla
2015 High1
2016 Anyang Halla
2017 Daemyung Killer Whales
2018 High1
2019 Daemyung Killer Whales
2021 Anyang Halla
2022 Anyang Halla

References

Ice hockey competitions in South Korea
Sports leagues established in 1946
1946 establishments in South Korea